XYP were a pop vocal group consisting of three men and three women from Scotland, England, Wales and the Netherlands. The members were brought together through auditions for the X.Y.Project which had been started by singer/songwriter Gary Barlow of Take That and some more big names in the music industry.

Their debut single "Body To Body" peaked at the number one spot in the Netherlands in January 2007. The group lived together in a house in Amsterdam where they collaborated on song writing for their debut album Confessions.  After only four singles and one album released, the group disbanded at the end of 2007.

Before XYP, Bart was in another pop group called K-otic. While with that band they achieved nine top ten singles and three top forty albums.

Emma Winterbourne has since married Bring Me the Horizon member, Jordan Fish.

Albums

Singles

References

British pop music groups
Musical groups established in 2006
Musical groups disestablished in 2007